Canadian Electric Vehicles Ltd. was first established in 1996 in Errington, British Columbia. During the initial years, its focus was to provide designs, parts and technical support for converting conventional internal combustion vehicles to non-polluting battery powered electric vehicles. Once converted, these vehicles were acquired by a variety of purchasers including federal and provincial governments, industrial companies as well as private individuals. The conversions ranged from three wheeled utility vehicles to house boats as well as various full-sized cars and trucks.

History
Canadian Electric Vehicles (CEV) has been designing and manufacturing electric vehicles and electric vehicle components for over 20 years. Vehicles in service range in size from three ton aircraft refueling and LAV trucks to the Might-E Tug, an electric towing unit which tows a variety of carts and equipment weighing up to 10,000 pounds.  The primary CEV product is the Might-E Truck, a custom heavy duty electric utility vehicle used by universities, government, parks, municipalities and private companies.

In 2000 Canadian Electric Vehicles was approached by Los Angeles airport to design and build an electric powered aircraft refueling truck.  Over 70 of these three ton trucks have been converted and are in use at airports in North America, Europe, Middle East and Australia.  Randy Holmquist, with his staff of technicians and engineers continues to offer contract research and development services for the design and prototyping of electric vehicles for various industrial applications.

Products and Services
Canadian Electric Vehicles is best known for the fully electric Might-E Truck, which they have been producing for over 15 years. The truck features  regenerative brakes, power steering, hydraulic lifts, and direct motor-to-differential drivetrains.

The Might-E Tug is another fully electric product developed and manufactured by Canadian Electric Vehicles. This three-wheeled tug employs a direct motor to differential drive train powered by a 24-volt, 70-amp four quadrant controller. It is designed to alleviate the user from pulling heavy loads by being able to pull weights up to 2000 lbs.

The firm has also engaged in a number of other projects including:

Electric Touring Carriage Drive System for New York's Central Park
Portable Industrial Air Compressors
Three-Wheeled Electric Police Patrol Vehicles
On-site 5 Ton Dump Truck Drive System for use in New Zealand's Forestry Industry
Rubber-Tracked Platform for use in Construction Projects in Japan
Electric Bobcat for Commercial Greenhouses
Prototype Consulting for Various Mining Vehicles

Since its inception, Canadian Electric Vehicles has been designing and producing conversion "kits" for the mechanically inclined hobbyist. These kits come in a variety of vehicles ranging from the Ford Ranger to a Volkswagen Beetle.

References

External links
 Canadian Electric Vehicles Website
 Might-E Truck Webpage
 Might-E Tug Webpage

Electric vehicle manufacturers of Canada
Manufacturing companies based in British Columbia
Vehicle manufacturing companies established in 1996
1996 establishments in British Columbia
Regional District of Nanaimo
Canadian companies established in 1996